Otto Eckl (1922-1993), was a male Austrian international table tennis player.

He won a bronze medal at the 1947 World Table Tennis Championships in the Swaythling Cup (men's team event). He then secured a second bronze at the 1948 World Table Tennis Championships in the Swaythling Cup.

See also
 List of table tennis players
 List of World Table Tennis Championships medalists

References

Austrian male table tennis players
1922 births
1993 deaths
World Table Tennis Championships medalists